The Canon PowerShot SX50 HS is a 12.1 megapixel PowerShot made by Canon, and super-zoom sporting a 50x zoom lens which is equivalent to a focal length of 24-1200mm. Succeeding the Canon PowerShot SX40 HS, it was announced in October 2012. It was succeeded by the Canon PowerShot SX60 HS in September 2014.

Compared to SX40 and SX70

Sample photos

References

External links
User Manual for PowerShot SX50 HS from Manualsmania

SX50 HS
Cameras introduced in 2012
Superzoom cameras

Canon cameras